Thita Lamsam (born 17 January 2000) is a Thai figure skater. She is a four-time Thai national champion (2014, 2016, 2018, and 2019) and a 2016 FBMA Trophy bronze medalist. She competed in the final segment of two ISU Championships – the 2016 Four Continents, finishing 22nd, and the 2018 Four Continents, finishing 23rd.

Programs

Results 
CS: Challenger Series; JGP: Junior Grand Prix

References

External links
 

2000 births
Thita Lamsam
Thita Lamsam
Thita Lamsam
Living people
Figure skaters at the 2017 Asian Winter Games
Competitors at the 2019 Southeast Asian Games
Competitors at the 2019 Winter Universiade
Thita Lamsam
Thita Lamsam